Finland competed at the 2016 European Athletics Championships. Team Finland consists of 40 athletes and the official goal for the championships is 10 athletes in the top 8.

Medals

Men's events

Track and road

Field

Women's events

Track and road

Field

References

2016
European Athletics Championships
Nations at the 2016 European Athletics Championships